Lauren Gussis is an American television writer and producer, known for the Showtime series Dexter, the NBC series E-Ring and the Netflix Original Series Insatiable (2018). She has been nominated for two Primetime Emmy Awards.

Early life
Gussis grew up in Chicago, Illinois during the 1990s.

Career
Gussis joined the crew of Showtime drama series Dexter as a staff writer for the first season in 2006. Gussis was nominated for a Writers Guild of America Award for best dramatic series at the February 2008 ceremony for her work on the first season of Dexter. She was promoted to story editor for the second season in 2007 and continued to script episodes. She joined the productions staff as a co-producer for the third season in 2008. She was again nominated for the WGA award at the February 2009 ceremony for her work on the third season of Dexter. She was promoted again to producer for the fourth season in 2009. She was nominated for the WGA award a third consecutive time at the February 2010 ceremony for her work on the fourth season. She was promoted again to supervising producer for the fifth season in 2010.

References

Living people
American television producers
American women television producers
American television writers
American women television writers
Place of birth missing (living people)
Year of birth missing (living people)
21st-century American women